The Apo–Talomo Range (also known as  Mount Talomo) or Talomo Mountain Range is a mountain Range located in the province of Davao del Sur and Cotabato in the island of Mindanao Philippines. The highest peak on the range is Mount Apo  it is the highest mountain in the Philippines. Mount Talomo  is one of the top 15 highest mountain in the Philippines. In terms of climbing difficulty, it is rated with a 7/9 difficulty and has a 2-4 trail class.

Peaks

List of peaks by elevation:

 Mount Apo 
 Mount Talomo 
 Mount Zion 
 Crater Peak 
 Anagon Peak

Hydrological features

Mount Talomo is a headwaters catchment area of several major river systems of Panigan River and Tamugan River, Talomo River. The Panigan River and Tamugan River are Tributaries of Davao River System. The Talomo River is a stream into Davao Gulf.

References 

Mountain ranges of the Philippines